The 2017 European Darts Grand Prix was the fourth of twelve PDC European Tour events on the 2017 PDC Pro Tour. The tournament took place at Glaspalast, Sindelfingen, Germany, between 5–7 May 2017. It featured a field of 48 players and £135,000 in prize money, with £25,000 going to the winner.

Michael van Gerwen was the defending champion, after defeating Peter Wright 6–2 in the final of the 2016 tournament, but Wright sought revenge by defeating Van Gerwen 6–0 in the final.

Prize money
This is how the prize money is divided:

Qualification and format
The top 16 players from the PDC ProTour Order of Merit on 27 April automatically qualified for the event and were seeded in the second round.

The remaining 32 places went to players from five qualifying events - 18 from the UK Qualifier (held in Wigan on 28 April), eight from the West/South European Qualifier, four from the Host Nation Qualifier (both held on 4 May), one from the Nordic & Baltic Qualifier (held on 17 March) and one from the East European Qualifier (held on 29 April).

The following players took part in the tournament:

Top 16
  Michael van Gerwen (runner-up)
  Peter Wright (champion)
  Mensur Suljović (third round)
  Simon Whitlock (second round)
  Dave Chisnall (semi-finals)
  James Wade (second round)
  Kim Huybrechts (third round)
  Benito van de Pas (quarter-finals)
  Gerwyn Price (third round)
  Alan Norris (second round)
  Jelle Klaasen (semi-finals)
  Ian White (second round)
  Michael Smith (second round)
  Joe Cullen (quarter-finals)
  Daryl Gurney (third round)
  Cristo Reyes (second round)

UK Qualifier 
  Stephen Bunting (first round)
  Mervyn King (first round)
  Steve West (third round)
  Joe Murnan (second round)
  Steve Beaton (first round)
  James Wilson (first round)
  Adrian Lewis (third round)
  Chris Dobey (first round)
  Paul Rowley (first round)
  Rob Cross (quarter-finals)
  Luke Woodhouse (first round)
  Mark Webster (third round)
  Steve Lennon (first round)
  John Henderson (second round)
  James Richardson (second round)
  Matt Clark (second round)
  Jonny Clayton (second round)
  Keegan Brown (second round)

West/South European Qualifier
  Ron Meulenkamp (first round)
  Dimitri Van den Bergh (second round)
  Jeffrey de Graaf (first round)
  Jermaine Wattimena (first round)
  Jan Dekker (quarter-finals)
  Christian Kist (first round)
  Zoran Lerchbacher (first round)
  Dirk van Duijvenbode (second round)

Home Nation Qualifier
  Gabriel Clemens (first round)
  Bernd Roith (first round)
  René Berndt (first round)
  Max Hopp (second round)

Nordic & Baltic Qualifier
  Ulf Ceder (third round)

East European Qualifier
  Krzysztof Ratajski (second round)

Draw

References

2017 PDC European Tour
2017 in German sport